Selmana is a small town and commune in Djelfa Province, Algeria, located in the south-eastern outskirts of Messaâd. According to the 1998 census it has a population of 14,008.

References

Communes of Djelfa Province
Cities in Algeria
Algeria